The Midwest League Top MLB Prospect Award is an annual award given to the best rookie player in Minor League Baseball's Midwest League based on their regular-season performance as voted on by league managers. League broadcasters, Minor League Baseball executives, and members of the media have previously voted as well. Though the league was established in 1947, the award was not created until 1956 as the Prospect of the Year Award. The Top MLB Prospect Award began to be issued instead of the Prospect of the Year Award in 2021.

Sixteen outfielders have won the Top MLB Prospect Award, the most of any position. Shortstops, with 13 winners, have won the most among infielders, followed by third basemen (4), first basemen (3), and second basemen (1). Twelve pitchers and five catchers have also won the award.

Twenty-four players who have won the Top MLB Prospect Award also won the Midwest League Most Valuable Player Award in the same season: Willie Wilson (1975), Paul Molitor (1977), Bill Foley (1978), Dave Stockstill (1979), Von Hayes (1980), Luis Medina (1986), Tom Redington (1989), Reggie Sanders (1990), Salomón Torres (1991), Steve Gibralter (1992), Pablo Ozuna (1998), Albert Pujols (2000), Adrián González (2001), Prince Fielder (2003), Brian Dopirak (2004), Carlos González (2005), Ben Revere (2008), Dee Strange-Gordon (2009), Mike Trout (2010), Rymer Liriano (2011), Byron Buxton (2013), Eloy Jiménez (2016), Bo Bichette (2017), and Andy Pages (2021).

Six players from the Cedar Rapids Kernels have been selected for the Top MLB Prospect Award, more than any other team in the league, followed by the Waterloo Indians (5); the Beloit Sky Carp and South Bend Cubs (4); the Burlington Bees, Clinton Pirates, Great Lakes Loons, Lansing Lugnuts, Peoria Chiefs, and Quad Cities River Bandits (3); the Fort Wayne TinCaps, Kenosha Twins, Wausau Timbers, West Michigan Whitecaps, and Wisconsin Timber Rattlers (2); and the Bowling Green Hot Rods, Dayton Dragons, Decatur Commodores, Kane County Cougars, Kokomo Dodgers, Michigan City White Caps, and Rockford Royals (1).

Eight players from the Minnesota Twins Major League Baseball (MLB) organization have won the award, more than any other, followed by the Chicago Cubs organization (6); the Cincinnati Reds, Kansas City Royals, Los Angeles Dodgers, and Milwaukee Brewers organizations (4); the Detroit Tigers, San Francisco Giants, and St. Louis Cardinals organizations (3); the Arizona Diamondbacks, Atlanta Braves, Cleveland Guardians, and Seattle Mariners organizations (2); and the Boston Red Sox, Los Angeles Angels, Miami Marlins, Pittsburgh Pirates,  San Diego Padres, Tampa Bay Rays, and Toronto Blue Jays organizations (1).

Winners

Wins by team

Active Midwest League teams appear in bold.

Wins by organization

Active Midwest League–Major League Baseball affiliations appear in bold.

References
Specific

General

Awards established in 1956
Minor league baseball trophies and awards
Top MLB Porospect
Rookie player awards